Viscom AG is a manufacturer of inspection technologies, in particular for automatic optical inspection (AOI) and X-ray inspection, with headquarters in Hanover, Germany. Viscom inspection solutions are used in automotive electronics, entertainment electronics, telecommunications, industrial electronics, and in the production of batteries.

History 
Viscom was founded in 1984 by Dr. Martin Heuser and Volker Pape as a developer of software for image processing. After relocating to its current location in the Badenstedt district of Hanover in 1992, the company began serial production of inspection systems for electronics. In 1995 Viscom established another of its main pillars with the introduction of microfocus X-ray inspection and the first system worldwide to combine inspection under incident light and X-ray. In 1998 subsidiaries were founded in the United States and Singapore, and a worldwide network of sales representatives was created. In 2001 Viscom tapped into yet another business sector with the introduction of its microsystem inspection. In the same year, the company changed its corporate form to a German stock corporation (AG) before its initial listing on the stock market in May 2006. In 2012 Viscom developed the one-of-a-kind XM camera sensor technology, which is still used in AOI systems to this day. Viscom achieved record sales in 2017. Co-founder Volker Pape was elected to the Supervisory Board on June 1, 2018, naming Carsten Salewski the new Director of Sales, Marketing and International Business. During the same period, former Head of Product Development Peter Krippner was promoted to the Executive Board in the role of COO.

Corporate Structure 
The following companies are branches of Viscom AG:
 Viscom France S.A.R.L., Paris, France
 Viscom Tunisie S.A.R.L., Tunis, Tunisia
 Viscom Inc., Duluth, GA, USA
 Viscom Inc., San José, CA, USA
 Viscom Inc., Austin, TX, USA
 Viscom Inc., Zapopan, Mexico
 Viscom Machine Vision Pte Ltd., Singapore
 Viscom Machine Vision Trading Co. Ltd., Shanghai, China
 VICN Automated Inspection Technology (Huizhou) Co. Ltd., Huizhou City, Guangdong province, China
 Viscom Machine Vision (India) Pvt. Ltd., Bangalore, India

Viscom also operates application and service centers around the globe.

Products 
Viscom's product range comprises six core areas: 
Optical serial inspection systems for solder paste inspection (3D SPI), placement monitoring and solder joint inspection (3D AOI)
X-ray inspection systems for performing inline or manual solder joint inspections on printed circuit boards and on large and heavy performance electronics (3D AOI/AXI, MXI)
Special X-ray inspection systems designed for the non-destructive testing of materials (NDT) and for 3D microfocus computed tomography (µCT)
Optical and X-ray wire bond inspection
Conformal coating inspection
X-ray systems for the inspection of energy storage devices

References 

 SMT Vision Awards Show Packs the Room

External links 
 www.viscom.com

German brands
Industrial machine manufacturers
Manufacturing companies based in Hanover
Technology companies of Germany
1984 establishments in Germany
Companies established in 1984